The 2018 Phoenix Rising FC season is the club's fifth season in the United Soccer League and their second under the Rising FC name.

Friendlies 
All times from this point are on Mountain Standard Time (UTC-07:00)

USL

Results summary

League results

USL Playoffs

Conference Playoffs

USL Championship

Western Conference standings

U.S. Open Cup

Statistics
(regular-season & Playoffs) 

One Own Goal scored vs Real Monarchs

Goalkeepers

Transfers

Loan in

Loan out

See also 
 2018 in American soccer
 2018 USL season
 Phoenix Rising FC

References 

2018
Phoenix Rising FC
Phoenix Rising FC
Phoenix Rising FC
Phoenix Rising FC